Jean Coleman may refer to:

 Jean Coleman (officer) (1908–1982), member of the British Special Operations Executive
 Jean Coleman (athlete) (1918–2008), Australian sprinter
 Jean Ellen Coleman, American librarian